Federico Nadi Terrade (1740-1824) was an Italian ballet dancer. He was a ballet master of the Royal Swedish Ballet on the Royal Swedish Opera in Stockholm from 1804 to 1806.

References 

1740 births
1824 deaths
Italian male ballet dancers
Ballet masters
18th-century Italian ballet dancers
19th-century Italian ballet dancers
Royal Swedish Ballet dancers